Tom Skilling (born February 20, 1952) is an American television meteorologist. Since 1978, he has worked as a meteorologist at WGN-TV in Chicago.

Career

Beginnings
The oldest of four children, Tom Skilling was born in the Chicago suburb of Aurora, Illinois, where he attended West Aurora High School. While in high school Tom began his career in broadcasting at age 14, working for WKKD and WKKD-FM. Skilling observed that WKKD's forecasts were  inaccurate because they were for Chicago and not Aurora, so he approached WKKD and offered to forecast the weather for several days, with the condition that if his forecasts were accurate he would be hired to host his own weather program. Skilling's forecasts were accurate, and he was hired to forecast Aurora's weather three times a day. At age 18, he began working at WLXT-TV in Aurora.

Skilling attended the University of Wisconsin in Madison to study meteorology and journalism. While attending the University of Wisconsin–Madison, he worked at WKOW-TV and WTSO radio, both in Madison. In 1975 Skilling took his first major-market television position, becoming the lead forecaster at WITI-TV in Milwaukee. At WITI, he delivered his forecasts with the "help" of the station's resident sock puppet mascot, Albert the Alley Cat.

WGN-TV
Skilling returned to the Chicago area and joined WGN-TV on August 13, 1978. He is currently WGN-TV's chief meteorologist and is rumored to be the highest-paid local broadcast meteorologist in the United States. He also writes the daily weather column for the Chicago Tribune. That feature, Ask Tom, ceased in August 2022 with a redesign of the weather page.

His weather broadcasts have always featured the latest technology in computer imagery and animation techniques. He has long been hailed for his in-depth reports and striking accuracy, perhaps best highlighted by his correctly predicting the Groundhog Day blizzard in 2011 almost two weeks before it paralyzed the Chicago area. "Skillful", as his late WGN-TV colleague Bob Collins called him, was consulted for the movie The Weather Man, which was set in Skilling's hometown of Chicago at a fictionalized version of WGN-TV.

Skilling is under contract at WGN until 2022.

He also narrated the documentaries It Sounded Like a Freight Train and When Lightning Strikes for the station, about the science and dangers of tornadoes (the documentary also includes the Chicago area's history of tornadoes) and lightning.

AMS and Fermilab
Skilling is a member of the American Meteorological Society and National Weather Association. He hosts annual tornado and severe weather seminars at the Fermi National Accelerator Lab (Fermilab) in Batavia, Illinois. 2013 marked the 32nd year of the seminar and the first that featured presentations specifically on climate change.

Awards and honors 
In January 1995, Tom received an Honorary Doctorate of Humanities from Lewis University in Romeoville, Illinois.

Asteroid 91888 Tomskilling, discovered by the Catalina Sky Survey in 1999, was named in his honor. The official  was published by the Minor Planet Center on October 8, 2014 (M.P.C. 90379).

Personal life
Tom is the older brother of Jeffrey Skilling, the former chief executive officer of Enron Corporation.

References

External links 

 WGN Weather Weblog
 WGN page "Ask Tom 'Why?'" - how to inquire about weather phenomena

University of Wisconsin–Madison School of Journalism & Mass Communication alumni
People from Aurora, Illinois
Living people
Television meteorologists from Chicago
1952 births
American television meteorologists
Date of birth missing (living people)